Hugh Herr (born October 25, 1964) is an American rock climber, engineer, and biophysicist.

Early life
The youngest of five siblings of a Mennonite family from Lancaster, Pennsylvania, Hugh Herr was a prodigy rock climber: by age 8, he had scaled the face of the  Mount Temple in the Canadian Rockies, and by 17 he was acknowledged to be one of the best climbers in the United States.

In January 1982, after having ascended a difficult technical ice route in Huntington Ravine on Mount Washington in New Hampshire, Herr and fellow climber Jeff Batzer were caught in a blizzard and became disoriented, finally descending into the Great Gulf where they passed three nights in  degree temperatures. By the time they were rescued, the climbers had severe frostbite. Both of Herr's legs had to be amputated below the knees; Batzer lost his lower left leg, the toes on his right foot, and the thumb and fingers on his right hand. During the rescue attempt, volunteer Albert Dow was killed by an avalanche.

Following months of surgeries and rehabilitation, Herr was doing what doctors told him was unthinkable: climbing again. Using specialized prostheses that he designed, he created prosthetic feet with high toe stiffness that made it possible to stand on small rock edges the width of a coin, and titanium-spiked feet that assisted him in ascending steep ice walls. He used these prostheses to alter his height to avoid awkward body positions and to grab hand and foot holds previously out of reach. His height could range from five to eight feet. As a result of using the prostheses, Herr climbed at a more advanced level than he had before the accident, making him the first person with a major amputation to perform in a sport on par with elite-level, able-bodied persons.

Personal life
Hugh Herr has two daughters, Alexandra and Sage. Under the direction and guidance of their mother, author Patricia Ellis Herr, both girls are accomplished hikers and trekkers. Alex's earliest hiking achievements are described in Patricia's memoir, Up: A Mother and Daughter's Peakbagging Adventure (Broadway Books, April 2012).

Education
After his climbing career, Herr began to focus on academics, previously an area of little interest to him. He earned an undergraduate degree in physics at his local college, Millersville University, and a master's degree in mechanical engineering at MIT, followed by a PhD in biophysics from Harvard University.

Career

While a postdoctoral fellow at MIT in biomedical devices, he began working on advanced leg prostheses and orthoses, devices that emulate the functionality of the human leg.

Herr is a professor at the MIT Media Lab, where he directs the Biomechatronics research group and co-directs the K. Lisa Yang Center for Bionics. At the center, he focuses on developing wearable robotic systems that serve to augment human physical capability. Most of what he designs is not for him, but for others to whose difficulties he can relate.

Herr has published over 120 peer-reviewed papers in the field of rehabilitation science and is the holder (or co-holder) of more than 100 patents related to assistive devices, including those for a computer-controlled artificial knee, commercially available as the Rheo Knee an active ankle-foot orthosis, and the world's first powered ankle-foot prosthesis.

These devices are advancing an emerging field of engineering science that applies principles of biomechanics and neural control to guide the designs of human rehabilitation and augmentative devices. The goal is to rehabilitate individuals that have undergone limb amputation or have a pathology, and also to augment human physical capability for those with normal intact physiologies.

The computer-controlled knee, which is outfitted with a microprocessor that continually senses the joint's position and the loads applied to the limb, was named one of the Top Ten Inventions in the health category by Time magazine in 2004. The robotic ankle-foot prosthesis, which mimics the action of a biological leg and, for the first time, provides transtibial amputees with a natural gait, was named to the same Time top-ten list in 2007.

In 2007, Herr was presented with the 13th Annual Heinz Award for Technology, the Economy and Employment. He is also the recipient of the Popular Mechanics Breakthrough Leadership Award (2005).

Herr was a member of a team of seven experts in biomechanics and physiology from six universities that conducted research on the mechanics of Oscar Pistorius' running blades. The South African bilateral amputee track athlete was banned by the International Association of Athletics Federations (IAAF) from running in able-bodied events, as previous research had shown the blades gave him a competitive advantage. A portion of these results were presented to the Court of Arbitration for Sport (CAS) in Lausanne, Switzerland in May 2008, by Herr and colleague Rodger Kram which resulted in reversing the ban. This allowed Pistorius to become the first disabled sprint runner to qualify against able-bodied athletes for an Olympic event. The full findings of the team's experiments were published in the June 18, 2009 issue of the Journal of Applied Physiology.

Herr's story has been told by Alison Osius in the book Second Ascent: The Story of Hugh Herr; a Discovery Channel feature story; and in a 2002 National Geographic movie, Ascent: The Story of Hugh Herr.

Herr was featured on a March 25, 2012 episode of CNN's The Next List.

A Nova PBS documentary featuring Herr premiered on February 23, 2022.

Grants and awards
 Sports Hall of Fame (1989)
 United States College Academic Team (1990)
 Young American Award (1990)
 Science magazine Next Wave: Best of 2003
 Time magazine Top Ten Inventions 2004
 With the Providence VA Center for Restorative and Regenerative Medicine and Brown University, a $7.2 million grant from the US Department of Veterans Affairs to create "biohybrid" limbs to restore natural function to amputees. (2004)
 Popular Mechanics Breakthrough Leadership Award (2005)
 The 13th Annual Heinz Award in Technology, the Economy and Employment (2007)
 Time  magazine Top Ten Inventions 2007
 Action Maverick Award (2008)
 Spirit of Da Vinci Award (2008)
 R&D Magazine 2014 Innovator of the Year
 Smithsonian magazine's American Ingenuity Award (2014) in the Technology Category
 Princess of Asturias Award for Technical & Scientific Research (2016)

Rock climbs
 1983 Vandals, Gunks, FA with Lynn Hill and Russ Clune, first 5.13 on the East Coast.
 1984 Stage Fright (5.12c X), Cathedral Ledge, North Conway, NH. First Ascent.
 1986 Ride of the Valkyries (5.12a), Careno Crag, Leavenworth, WA – First Ascent.
 1986 City Park (5.13c), Index Town Walls, WA – 2nd ascent.

Biography

References

External links

 MIT Media Lab: Hugh Herr, Associate Professor of Media Arts and Science
 MIT Media Lab: Biomechatronics
 BiOM Board of Directors: Dr. Hugh Herr – Founder
 
 YouTube Video "The World We Dream – Hugh Herr Zeitgeist" 2012
 Boston "Best Foot Forward", February 2009 
 Esquire "Hugh Herr's New Parts", November 30, 2006
 Wired Italy "Hugh Herr: L'impronta dell'evoluzione", May 13, 2009
 National Geographic Channel "Ascent: The Story of Hugh Herr"
 MIT News "Herr wins $250,000 Heinz Award" September 12, 2007
 The Heinz Awards, Hugh Herr profile

1964 births
Living people
American biophysicists
Engineers from Pennsylvania
American people with disabilities
American rock climbers
Sportspeople with limb difference
Harvard University alumni
Massachusetts Institute of Technology alumni
Millersville University of Pennsylvania alumni
Sportspeople from Lancaster, Pennsylvania
American amputees
MIT Media Lab people
Scientists with disabilities